Sincerely, John the Ghost is the debut extended play recorded by American indie rock singer John O'Callaghan known by his alias John the Ghost. He released the EP on April 29, 2016. "Sour Grapes" was released as the first and only single from the EP.

Background
O'Callaghan began going under the moniker John the Ghost in 2016. He wrote and recorded Sincerely, John the Ghost in his bedroom. "Sour Grapes" was released as the first single from the EP on April 12, 2016. To accompany the record, O'Callaghan also released a book of poetry titled the same name of his EP.

Critical reception

Jenna Romaine of idobi Radio gave the EP an A+ rating. She stated, "unsurprisingly, what shines the most are the lyrics." She also stated that the EP feels "candid and sincere," and is bound to "capture listeners and keep them wanting more." She ended off remarking, "this is a debut EP you’ll want to be able to keep re-living and re-playing." Alternative Press named the EP as one of the solo projects to check out in 2016.

Track listing

Charts

References

2016 EPs